The "Jujalarim" (Cyrillic: Ҹүҹәләрим,  — my little chicks) is an Azerbaijani song composed for children. The first time it was sung by Sughra Baghirzade in May 1959 at the Festival of the Decade of Azerbaijani Art in Moscow.
Its music was composed by Ganbar Huseinli in 1949 and the lyrics were by Tofig Mutallibov.

It is about a mother chicken who takes good care of her little chicks, making sure that they get enough food and water.
The song gained popularity amongst children in the USSR and far beyond its borders. It also appeared in episode 6, "Countryside" (1973), of the Nu, pogodi!.

The song was translated into many languages such as Russian, English, German, Japanese, Bulgarian, Polish, Serbo-Croatian and Romanian.

Text

References

External links 
Information in the following sources is in Azerbaijani: 
 Article on "Azərbaycan" Qəzeti
 Documentary video from Azerbaijan Public Television
 Jujalarim in No pogodi!

Azerbaijani songs
Azerbaijani-language songs
Azerbaijani music